Ruth Sánchez Bueno (born 10 July 1975), better known as Ruth Gabriel, is a Spanish actress.

Biography
Ruth Sánchez Bueno (her real name) was born in San Fernando (province of Cádiz) on 10 July 1975, daughter of actor Ismael Abellán and writer . Her aunt on the father side Susi Sánchez is also an actress. She spent her childhood in Madrid. 

At 14 years of age, she moved to the United States, where she took interpretation classes. She later continued her education in Florence, Italy, where her mother had moved. Upon returning to Madrid, she continued her artistic development through dance and fencing classes, working as a waiter.

She took the name Ruth Gabriel when she acted in her first film, Días contados by Imanol Uribe.  She received the Concha de Oro and the Goya Award for Best New Actress and was nominated for Best Leading Actress.

She acted in Señales de fuego, by the Portuguese Luis Filipe Rocha; Gran Slalom, by Jaime Chávarri; and 99.9, by Agustí Villaronga.

She participated in the first season of the series Querido maestro, with Imanol Arias y Emma Suárez between 1997 and 1998. In 1997 she appeared in Nostromo.

Her first interpretation job was for the Spanish version of Sesame Street (Barrio Sésamo),

Filmography

Film 

Días contados (1994), de Imanol Uribe
Felicidades Tovarich (1995), de Antonio Eceiz
Señales de fuego (1995), de Luís Filipe Rocha
A tres bandas (1997), de Enrico Coletti
99.9 (1997), de Agustí Villaronga
Doña Bárbara (1998), Betty Kaplan
Sinfín (2002), de Álvaro Olavarría y Alberto Ortiza
Besos de gato (2003), de Rafael Alcázar
Historia de Estrella (2003), Manuel Estudillo
Lazos rotos (2007), de Miquel García Borda

Television 
La cometa blanca (1982)
Barrio Sésamo (1983–1987)
Querido maestro (1997)
Nostromo (1997)
La Mari (2003) (miniseries)

Theater 

La casa de Bernarda Alba (2006)

References

External links

1975 births
Living people
Spanish film actresses
Spanish stage actresses
Spanish television actresses
People from San Fernando, Cádiz
20th-century Spanish actresses
21st-century Spanish actresses